Anne Rice's Mayfair Witches, or simply Mayfair Witches, is an American supernatural thriller drama television series created by Esta Spalding and Michelle Ashford, based on the novel trilogy Lives of the Mayfair Witches by Anne Rice. The series stars Alexandra Daddario as Rowan Fielding, Harry Hamlin as Cortland Mayfair, Tongayi Chirisa as Ciprien Grieve, and Jack Huston as Lasher. It premiered on AMC on January 8, 2023, and is the second television series in Rice's Immortal Universe, following Interview with the Vampire. In February 2023, the series was renewed for a second season.

Premise
Neurosurgeon Dr. Rowan Fielding learns she is the heiress to a dynasty of powerful witches haunted by a sinister spirit.

Cast and characters

Main

 Alexandra Daddario as Rowan Fielding, a neurosurgeon who learns that she is the heiress to the Mayfair dynasty
 Tongayi Chirisa as Ciprien Grieve, an agent of the Talamasca assigned to Rowan, and a combination of the characters Michael Curry and Aaron Lightner from the novels
 Jack Huston as Lasher, a powerful, shape-shifting entity who has been bound to the Mayfair witches for centuries
 Harry Hamlin as Cortland Mayfair, the current Mayfair patriarch

Recurring

 Beth Grant as Carlotta Mayfair, Rowan's severe and controlling aunt, and Cortland's sister
 Erica Gimpel as Elena Fielding, Rowan's adopted mother, secretly a Mayfair cousin who is aware of Rowan's connection to the family
 Annabeth Gish as Deirdre Mayfair, Rowan's biological mother, an invalid plagued by the manipulative Lasher
 Geraldine Singer as Millie Mayfair, Cortland's other sister
 Hannah Alline as Suzanne, a healer in 1681 Donnelaith, Scotland, and the ancestor of the Mayfair witches
 Ravi Naidu as Samir, Ciprien's superior at the Talamasca
 Jen Richards as Josephine "Jojo" Mayfair, Cortland's daughter
 Keyara Milliner as Odette Grieve, Ciprien's sister
 Charlayne Woodard as Dolly Jean Mayfair, Cortland's cousin
 Suleka Mathew as Arjuna, a Talamasca healer

In addition, Madison Wolfe guest stars as Tessa, a young Mayfair cousin of Rowan's, and Dennis Boutsikaris guest stars as Albrecht, the local leader of the Talamasca. Emma Rose Smith co-stars as Florie, Suzanne's younger sister, while Ian Hoch co-stars as Keith Murfis, a coroner and observer of the Mayfairs who becomes involved with an anti-witch cult.

Production

Development
Development rights to Anne Rice's Lives of the Mayfair Witches book series were still held by Warner Bros in December 2019, when Rice began shopping a package combining film and TV rights to both The Vampire Chronicles and Mayfair Witches. Rice was reportedly asking around $30 to $40 million, plus a $2.5 million buyout of Warner Bros.' rights, and the new owner would hold the rights in perpetuity, not just as an option. In May 2020, it was announced that AMC had acquired the rights to The Vampire Chronicles and Lives of the Mayfair Witches for developing film and television projects. Anne and Christopher Rice would serve as executive producers on any projects developed. Rice said, "It's always been my dream to see the worlds of my two biggest series united under a single roof so that filmmakers could explore the expansive and interconnected universe of my vampires and witches. That dream is now a reality, and the result is one of the most significant and thrilling deals of my long career."

In December 2021, Deadline Hollywood reported that Anne Rice's Mayfair Witches had been given an eight-episode series order by AMC, with another Rice series, Interview with the Vampire, already in production at the network. Mayfair Witches will be written and executive produced by Esta Spalding and Michelle Ashford, and executive produced by Mark Johnson. Spalding and Ashford said, "The world of witches has fascinated and terrified for centuries, and yet Anne Rice's particular lens on witches explored something new altogether—women who are powerful, and often brutal, and always committed to subverting our current power structures." Johnson added, "My good fortune as an executive producer of Anne Rice's Interview with the Vampire has now been more than doubled with what Esta Spalding and Michelle Ashford are imagining with The Mayfair Witches. While both shows couldn't be more different, they nevertheless find themselves bound under the same bewitching and engaging umbrella." In January 2023, at AMC's TCA press tour, Johnson announced a crossover between Mayfair Witches and Interview with the Vampire is in discussions. On February 3, 2023, AMC renewed the series for a second season.

Casting
In March 2022, Variety reported that Alexandra Daddario had been cast in the lead role of Dr. Rowan Fielding. Dan McDermott, president of entertainment and AMC Studios for AMC Networks, said "Alexandra is a singular talent who has lit up the screen in everything she's been in and we couldn't be happier to have her on board, leading the cast of a series that will be a centerpiece of an expanding Anne Rice universe on AMC+ and AMC. We found our Rowan and can't wait for her to meet viewers later this year". Harry Hamlin joined the cast that same month as patriarch Cortland Mayfair. In April 2022, AMC announced the casting of series regular Tongayi Chirisa as Ciprien Grieve, as well as Annabeth Gish as Deirdre Mayfair, Beth Grant as Carlotta Mayfair, Erica Gimpel as Ellie Mayfair and Jen Richards as Jojo, in recurring roles. In May 2022, Jack Huston was cast as Lasher, described as one of Rice's "most mysterious and sensual characters—a powerful, shape-shifting entity who has been bound to the Mayfair witches for hundreds of years."

Filming
As of May 2022, filming for Mayfair Witches was under way in New Orleans.

Episodes

Release
Like Interview with the Vampire, the series was originally set to premiere on AMC+ and the AMC linear network, with an intended release of late 2022, and then on January 5, 2023. The series premiered on AMC and AMC+ on January 8, 2023, and consists of eight episodes.

Reception

Critical response
The review aggregator website Rotten Tomatoes reported a 46% approval rating with an average rating of 5.8/10, based on 28 critic reviews. The website's critics consensus reads, "Mayfair Witches has competent gloss and a likable lead in Alexandra Daddario, but this brew is made up of too many derivative elements to conjure a compelling spell of its own." Metacritic, which uses a weighted average, assigned a score of 47 out of 100 based on 10 critics, indicating "mixed or average reviews".

Ratings

References

External links
 
 

2020s American drama television series
2020s American horror television series
2020s American supernatural television series
2023 American television series debuts
Adaptations of works by Anne Rice
AMC (TV channel) original programming
Demons in television
English-language television shows
Fiction about psychic powers
Ghosts in television
Gothic television shows
Horror drama television series
Television series set in the 18th century
Television series set in the 19th century
Television series set in the 20th century
Television shows based on American novels
Television shows set in New Orleans
Television shows set in Paris
Witchcraft in television